Major-General John Christopher Blake Sutherell CB CBE DL (born 23 October 1947) is a former British Army officer who became Commandant of the Royal Military College of Science.

Military career
Educated at Christ's Hospital and Grey College, Durham, Sutherell was commissioned into the Royal Anglian Regiment in 1968. He was made Commanding Officer of 1st Bn Royal Anglian Regiment in 1987 and became Commander of 8th Infantry Brigade in Northern Ireland in 1990. He went on to be Deputy Military Secretary in 1994, Director Special Forces in 1996 and Commandant of the Royal Military College of Science in 1999 before retiring in 2002.

In retirement he has become General Secretary of the Officers' Association. He is also a Deputy Lieutenant of Suffolk.

References

|-

1947 births
Living people
British Army major generals
Companions of the Order of the Bath
Commanders of the Order of the British Empire
Royal Anglian Regiment officers
Deputy Lieutenants of Suffolk
Alumni of Grey College, Durham
Military personnel from Cambridgeshire